Doverdale is a small village and civil parish in Worcestershire, England, to the west of Droitwich. It has a parish church. Doverdale Manor is one of largest properties in the village and is grade II listed.
 
Since 1973 there  has been a combined parish council for Ombersley and Doverdale. The parish council website, states that "combining of the Parishes of Ombersley and Doverdale in 1973 created one of the largest parishes in Worcestershire", and the Neighbourhood Development Plan refers (eg page 5) to "the parish of Ombersley and Doverdale", but other sources - Office for National Statistics, Ordnance Survey, MapIt,  NHLE - indicate that the two parishes still exist as separate entities.

Ombersley is in Wychavon district of the county of Worcestershire, and in the parliamentary constituency of Mid Worcestershire.  

 there are 6 listed buildings in the parish.

References

Villages in Worcestershire
Civil parishes in Worcestershire
Wychavon